Donji Lug is a geographic area in Bosnia and Herzegovina situated in the northern Bosnia in the lower basin of the river Liješnica, left tributary of the river Bosna.

Geography of Bosnia and Herzegovina

Regions of Bosnia and Herzegovina